Onyaanya Constituency is an electoral constituency in the Oshikoto Region of Namibia. It had 13,474 inhabitants in 2004 and 11,434 registered voters . Its district capital is the settlement of Onyaanya.

Politics
Onyaanya constituency is traditionally a stronghold of the South West Africa People's Organization (SWAPO) party.

The councillor elected in the 2010 regional elections was Henock Kankoshi. He was subsequently elected to represent Oshikoto Region in the National Council of Namibia. In the 2015 local and regional elections the SWAPO candidate won uncontested and became councillor after no opposition party nominated a candidate. The SWAPO candidate also won the 2020 regional election. Gideon Shikomba received 4,023 votes, well ahead of Onesmus Kapuka of the Independent Patriots for Change (IPC), a party formed in August 2020, who obtained 1,063 votes.

Education
 Amakali Combined School
 Uukule Cluster

See also
 Administrative divisions of Namibia

References

Constituencies of Oshikoto Region
States and territories established in 1992
1992 establishments in Namibia